US Post Office-Harrison is a historic post office building located at Harrison in Westchester County, New York, United States. It was built in 1938 by the Office of the Supervising Architect under the direction of Louis A. Simon.  It is a one-story, symmetrically massed building clad with random stone ashlar in the Colonial Revival style.  The entrance is flanked by fluted, engaged Doric order columns and pilasters which support a simple entablature.  The slate roof is topped by a square, flat topped cupola.  The lobby features a 1941 mural by Harold Goodwin titled "Early Days of the Automobile."

It was listed on the National Register of Historic Places in 1989.

See also
National Register of Historic Places listings in southern Westchester County, New York

References

Harrison, New York
Buildings and structures in Westchester County, New York
Government buildings completed in 1938
Harrison
National Register of Historic Places in Westchester County, New York
Colonial Revival architecture in New York (state)